Minstrel Island Water Aerodrome, formerly , was a public airport located adjacent to Minstrel Island, British Columbia, Canada.  Minstrel Island is on the south side of the lower reaches of Knight Inlet and is to the north of East Cracroft Island.

References

Defunct seaplane bases in British Columbia
Regional District of Mount Waddington
Registered aerodromes in British Columbia